The 1989–90 Winnipeg Jets season was the 18th season of the Winnipeg Jets, their 11th season in the National Hockey League. The Jets placed third in the Smythe to qualify for the playoffs. The Jets lost to the Edmonton Oilers in the first round.

Offseason
During the previous season, the Jets replaced general manager John Ferguson with Mike Smith, while head coach Dan Maloney was replaced with Rick Bowness on an interim basis.  On May 25, 1989, the Jets named Bob Murdoch as their new head coach.  Murdoch had previous head coaching experience in the NHL, as he was the Chicago Blackhawks head coach for the 1987-88 season, going 30-41-9.

At the 1989 NHL Entry Draft held on June 17, 1989, the Jets held the fourth overall selection, and drafted Stu Barnes from the Tri-City Americans of the WHL.  Barnes had 59 goals and 141 points with the Americans during the 1988-89 season.  Other notable players the Jets selected were Kris Draper in the third round, and Dan Bylsma in the sixth round.

The Jets were also busy with trades at the 1989 NHL Entry Draft, as they acquired Randy Cunneyworth, Rick Tabaracci and Dave McLlwain from the Pittsburgh Penguins for Randy Gilhen, Andrew McBain and Jim Kyte.  Cunneyworth, was coming off a 25-goal, 44-point season in 70 games in 1988-89, while McLlwain had a goal and three points in 24 games with the Penguins.  Tabaracci posted a 24-20-5 record with a 4.24 GAA with the Cornwall Royals of the OHL.

The Jets also acquired Greg Paslawski and the St. Louis Blues third round pick in the 1989 NHL Entry Draft from the Blues for the Jets third round pick in the 1989 NHL Entry Draft and second round pick in the 1991 NHL Entry Draft, and Winnipeg traded away their third round pick in the 1990 NHL Entry Draft to the New Jersey Devils for the Devils third round pick in the 1989 NHL Entry Draft.

On July 22, 1989, the Jets acquired Shawn Cronin from the Philadelphia Flyers for future considerations.  Cronin had three goals and 12 points with the Baltimore Skipjacks of the AHL during the 1988-89 season.  On September 28, 1989, Winnipeg acquired Keith Acton and Pete Peeters from the Philadelphia Flyers for future considerations, however, both Acton and Peeters were returned to Philadelphia on October 3, 1989, for the Flyers fifth round draft pick in the 1991 NHL Entry Draft.

Also, on September 28, 1989, the Jets traded goaltender Pokey Reddick to the Edmonton Oilers for future considerations, and on October 2, 1989, Winnipeg selected Moe Mantha from the Philadelphia Flyers in the NHL Waiver Draft.  Mantha, who played with the Jets from 1980 to 1984, split the 1988-89 season between the Minnesota North Stars and Philadelphia Flyers, scoring four goals and 18 points in 46 games.

The team chose to have three captains this season, naming veterans Randy Carlyle, Dale Hawerchuk and Thomas Steen. Hawerchuk had been the sole captain since 1984.

Regular season

Final standings

Schedule and results

Playoffs
The Jets lost the Division Semi-finals (4-3) to the Edmonton Oilers.

Player statistics

Regular season
Scoring

Goaltending

Playoffs
Scoring

Goaltending

Awards and records

Transactions

Trades

Waivers

Free agents

|}

Draft picks
Winnipeg selected the following players at the 1989 NHL Entry Draft, which was held at the Met Center in Bloomington, Minnesota, on June 17, 1989.

NHL Amateur Draft

Farm teams

See also
 1989–90 NHL season

References

External links

Winnipeg Jets season, 1989-90
Winnipeg Jets (1972–1996) seasons
Winn